Jørgen Nielsen Møller (17  November 1801 - 6  July 1862) was a Danish merchant, governor of Holsteinsborg (now Sisimiut) and Inspector of South Greenland.

Biography
He was the son of Niels Jørgensen Møller and Karen Rasmusdatter. 
Møller studied law before working as an assistant in Nuuk, Qeqertarsuatsiaat, Paamiut, Aasiaat, Sisimiut and Qaqortoq.
Møller served as Governor of Holsteinsborg  for 13 years until he replaced the Inspector of South Greenland, Carl Peter Holbøll (1795-1856), who was lost at sea returning from Denmark in 1856. He served as Inspector until the following year, when his son-in-law, Hinrich Johannes Rink (1819–1893) replaced him.

He was married to Antonette Ernestine Constance Tommerup (1813-91). His daughter was the noted Greenland-born ethnologist Signe Rink (1836–1909).

See also
 List of inspectors of Greenland

References 

1801 births
1862 deaths
Danish sailors
Inspectors of Greenland
19th-century Danish people
History of the Arctic